Paul Methuen (16 May 1723 – 22 January 1795) was an English politician.

He was the son of Thomas Methuen of Bradford-on-Avon and was the cousin and heir of politician-diplomat Sir Paul Methuen (1672–1757). He went to Oriel College, Oxford.

He was Member of Parliament (MP) for Westbury 1747–1748, for Warwick 1762–1768, and Great Bedwyn 1774–1781.

Methuen bought Garsdon manor, Wiltshire, in 1758. His grandson, also Paul, became Baron Methuen in 1838.

References

1723 births
1795 deaths
People from Bradford-on-Avon
Alumni of Oriel College, Oxford
Members of the Parliament of Great Britain for English constituencies
British MPs 1747–1754
British MPs 1761–1768
British MPs 1774–1780
British MPs 1780–1784
Members of Parliament for Great Bedwyn
Paul